Christopher Lee Ivory (born March 22, 1988) is an American former football running back in the National Football League (NFL). He was signed by the New Orleans Saints as an undrafted free agent in 2010 and also played for the New York Jets, Jacksonville Jaguars, and Buffalo Bills. He played college football at Washington State and Tiffin.

Early years
Ivory earned letters in both football and track and field in high school at Longview High School in Longview, Texas, playing on the Lobos team that included future NFL players Trent Williams, Malcolm Kelly, and Robert Henson. He was listed as a two-star recruit by both Rivals.com and Scout.com.

College career

Washington State
Ivory played three years for Washington State from 2006–2008. Limited by injuries, in 22 games he had 91 rushes for 534 yards and four touchdowns, as well as 23 kickoff returns averaging 22.8 yards. When the coaches who had recruited him were replaced by a new coaching staff, Ivory found himself far down on the Cougars' depth chart. In August 2009, he was dismissed from the Washington State team for violating team rules.

Statistics

Tiffin University
Ivory then transferred to Tiffin University, a Division II school in Tiffin, Ohio, whose team was coached by Dave Walkosky, a former Washington State assistant coach. In Ivory's final year of college football, he had 39 rushes for 223 yards in five games before suffering a season-ending knee injury. Walkosky attempted to obtain a medical redshirt exemption to allow Ivory to play another year, but this was unsuccessful. Despite his brief stint at Tiffin University, Ivory's performance and speed attracted attention from NFL scouts, and he was thought to have a chance of becoming the first Tiffin University player to be drafted by the NFL. The Saints became interested in Ivory, despite his injuries, after one of their scouts was impressed by Walkosky's enthusiastic recommendations.

Professional career
Ivory became eligible for the 2010 NFL Draft after his season, but did not receive an invitation to perform at the NFL Combine. On March 16, 2010, Ivory attended Toledo's Pro Day and completed all of the combine and positional drills. At the conclusion of the pre-draft process, Ivory was projected to go undrafted by NFL draft experts and scouts. He was ranked as the 32nd best running back prospect in the draft by DraftScout.com.

New Orleans Saints
On April 27, 2010, the New Orleans Saints signed Ivory as an undrafted free agent to a three-year, $1.22 million contract.
He had an impressive performance in training camp and preseason games, highlighted by a strong performance against the San Diego Chargers that included a 76-yard touchdown on a swing pass.

Early season injuries to Reggie Bush and Pierre Thomas left Ivory as the Saints' starting running back. He had a breakout game in Week 6 against Tampa Bay Buccaneers: his 158 yards on 15 carries were the most by any Saints running back since Deuce McAllister rushed for 165 yards in a 2003 game, and the most by a Saints rookie since a 179-yard effort by Ricky Williams in 1999. The performance earned him awards as both Pepsi NFL Rookie of the Week and FedEx Ground Player of the Week. Another strong performance in Week 11, with 23 rushes for 99 yards in a 34–19 win over against the Seattle Seahawks, led Seahawks coach Pete Carroll to call Ivory "a freaking stud out there." Ivory ended the regular season with 137 rushes for 716 yards, which led the team, and five touchdowns, but he also suffered repeated injuries during the year; after a foot injury in the Saints' last regular season game, he was placed on the injured reserve list and was unable to play in the postseason. He was named to the NFL All-Rookie Team.

Ivory spent the first six games of the 2011 season on the PUP list; after he was activated, he played in six games, with 79 rushes for 374 yards, and 22 carries for 70 yards in the Saints' two playoff games against the Detroit Lions in the Wild Card Round and the San Francisco 49ers in the Divisional Round. In May 2012, the Saints paid Ivory an additional signing bonus to make up for the income he lost on the PUP list. He became a restricted free agent after the 2012 season. He appeared in six games in the 2012 season and recorded 40 carries for 217 rushing yards and two rushing touchdowns.

New York Jets
Ivory was traded to the New York Jets on April 26, 2013, during the 2013 NFL Draft for the Jets' fourth round draft pick (106th overall). He signed a three-year contract worth $10 million. He made his Jets debut in the season opener against the Tampa Bay Buccaneers. On October 20, against the New England Patriots, he had 34 carries for 104 yards. On October 3, he had 139 rushing yards and a rushing touchdown against the New Orleans Saints. Overall, in the 2013 season, he had 833 rushing yards, three rushing touchdowns, and ten receiving yards.

On September 7, 2014, he had a 71-yard touchdown run as part of a 102-yard performance against the Oakland Raiders in the season opener. It was the second longest touchdown run in Jets history; Bruce Harper ran for 78 yards in 1983. On October 16, against the New England Patriots, he had 107 rushing yards and a touchdown. Ten days later, he had his lone two-touchdown performance of the season against the Buffalo Bills. Overall, he finished the 2014 season with 821 rushing yards, six rushing touchdowns, and 18 receptions for 123 yards and a receiving touchdown.

In the 2015 season opener against the Cleveland Browns, Ivory had 91 rushing yards and two rushing touchdowns in the 31–10 victory. On October 4, 2015, during an NFL International Series matchup against the Miami Dolphins at Wembley Stadium, Ivory rushed for 166 yards and a touchdown, setting a career-high in rushing yards. He followed that up with 146 rushing yards and a rushing touchdown against the Washington Redskins. Ivory won the AFC rushing title in the 2015 season beating Latavius Murray by four yards, finishing the year with 1,070 rushing yards and his first Pro Bowl selection. He was ranked 78th by his fellow players on the NFL Top 100 Players of 2016.

Jacksonville Jaguars
Ivory signed a three-year deal with the Jacksonville Jaguars on March 10, 2016.

On October 16, 2016, Ivory had 11 carries for 32-yards and scored his first rushing touchdown with the team as the Jaguars defeated the Chicago Bears by a score of 17–16. On November 6, he had 107 rushing yards against the Kansas City Chiefs. Overall, he finished the 2016 season with 439 rushing yards, three rushing touchdowns, 20 receptions, and 186 receiving yards.

Ivory entered the 2017 season second on the depth chart behind rookie Leonard Fournette. He played in 14 games with three starts, rushing for 382 yards and one touchdown.

On February 23, 2018, Ivory was released by the Jaguars.

Buffalo Bills
On March 6, 2018, Ivory signed a two-year contract with the Buffalo Bills for $5.5 million, with $3.25 million guaranteed. In Week 3, against the Minnesota Vikings, he had 126 scrimmage yards in the 27–6 victory. He rushed for 385 yards and one touchdown along with 13 receptions for 205 yards in 2018.

On March 27, 2019, Ivory was released by the Bills.

NFL career statistics

Career awards and highlights
 Pro Bowl selection (2015)
 PFWA All-AFC selection (2015)
 AFC rushing yards leader (2015)
 4× FedEx Ground Player of the Week  (Week 6, 2010, Week 7, 2013, Week 4, 2015, Week 6, 2015)
 Pepsi NFL Rookie of the Week (Week 6, 2010)
 NFL All-Rookie Team

References

External links

 Washington State Cougars bio

1988 births
Living people
People from Longview, Texas
Players of American football from Texas
Longview High School alumni
American football running backs
Washington State Cougars football players
Tiffin Dragons football players
New Orleans Saints players
New York Jets players
Jacksonville Jaguars players
Buffalo Bills players
Unconferenced Pro Bowl players